Casey Prather (born May 29, 1991) is an American professional basketball player for Hapoel Eilat of the Israeli Basketball Premier League. He played college basketball for the University of Florida before playing professionally in the NBA Development League, Australia, Germany and Greece. In 2016, he won an NBL championship with the Perth Wildcats. He helped the Wildcats defend their title in 2017, while earning All-NBL First Team honors. With a move to Melbourne United came another championship for Prather, as he collected a personal three-peat in 2018.

Early life
Prather was born and raised in Jackson, Tennessee, under the stern watch of his mother Enova and sister Brittany, with his parents having split before he was born. Growing up, family and basketball kept him away from the growing criminal element in his community. At the age of 12, his stepfather, Jeffery, noticed Prather's athleticism and began teaching him the skills required to pursue playing professionally.

High school career
Prather attended Jackson's North Side High School, where he averaged 28 points per game as a sophomore, and 24.4 points and 14 rebounds as a junior. During his junior season, he had a 53-point, 24-rebound performance in a district game against Fayette Ware High School. Following his junior year, he was ranked the 25th best prospect by Scout.com, and the 10th best small forward. On November 17, 2009, he signed a National Letter of Intent to play college basketball for the University of Florida.

As a senior in 2009–10, Prather was a finalist for Tennessee's Mr. Basketball after averaging 29 points, 13 rebounds, five blocks, five steals and three assists per game. He finished his four-year career at North Side with over 2,000 points. He was selected to the All-District team and was named team MVP all four seasons at North Side, and was selected to the district's All-Tournament team his sophomore, junior and senior seasons. He was also named All-West Player of the Year in 2008–09 and 2009–10.

During his time at North Side, Prather was member of the Nashville Celtics AAU team that captured the 2010 River City Showdown Championship.

College career

Prather played four seasons of college basketball for Billy Donovan's Florida Gators. Over his first three college seasons, Prather was a key role player off the bench. As a junior in 2012–13, Prather played in 29 games with two starting assignments, and averaged a career-best 6.2 points per game. He led the Southeastern Conference (SEC) with a .642 two-point field goal percentage. He twice scored a season-high 12 points, and had an 11-point game in Florida's Sweet 16 win over Florida Gulf Coast.

As a senior year in 2013–14, Prather stepped up to become a key scorer for the Gators, more than doubling his scoring average from his junior year. He led the Gators in scoring and was named first-team All-SEC. He became the third Gator under Billy Donovan to record three 27-point games in a single season, joining Nick Calathes (2008–09) and Teddy Dupay (2000–01). He totaled six 20-point games, including his career-best 28 points in Florida's season opener against North Florida. This increase in production was a key factor for Florida becoming one of the top teams of the 2013–14 season. For the fourth straight year, the Gators reached the Regional Finals, where they defeated Dayton to move on to the Final Four. In the National semi-finals, the Gators were defeated by Connecticut to fall short of reaching the Championship Game, despite a 15-point effort from Prather. In 37 games (35 starts) for the Gators in 2013–14, he averaged 13.8 points, 5.0 rebounds, 1.6 assists and 1.0 steals per game. He led the SEC, and was seventh in the NCAA, with a .603 field goal percentage, and led the SEC in two-point field goal percentage for the second season in a row, at .607.

Professional career

Summer League and D-League (2014–2015)
After going undrafted in the 2014 NBA draft, Prather played for the Atlanta Hawks during the 2014 Las Vegas Summer League. In five games, he averaged 5.2 points and 2.2 rebounds in 20.3 minutes per game. He later signed with the Phoenix Suns on September 26, but was waived on October 14 after appearing in one preseason game. In November, he joined the Bakersfield Jam of the NBA Development League. In January, he helped the Jam win the inaugural NBA Development League Showcase Cup, scoring 16 points in the final against the Grand Rapids Drive. On March 22, he scored a season-high 30 points in a 124–113 win over the Rio Grande Valley Vipers. In the Jam's regular-season finale on April 4, Prather had a 25-point effort in a 113–99 loss to the Santa Cruz Warriors. The Jam finished with a 34–16 record and entered the playoffs as the third seed in the Western Conference. In the first round of the playoffs, the Jam faced the Austin Spurs, but despite winning the opening contest, they went on to lose the series in three games. Prather had his best effort of the series in Game 2, scoring 21 points. In 49 games for Bakersfield in 2014–15, he averaged 12.0 points, 3.7 rebounds, 1.8 assists and 1.3 steals per game.

After playing for the NBA D-League Select Team during the 2015 Las Vegas Summer League, Prather was lured to Australia by former college teammate Scottie Wilbekin.

Perth Wildcats (2015–2017)

2015–16 season

On July 25, 2015, Prather signed with the Perth Wildcats for the 2015–16 NBL season. He missed three games early in the season due to a knee injury. On November 22, he scored a then season-high 26 points and made the winning free throw with 1.5 seconds left in the match to lift the Wildcats to a 91–90 win over the Cairns Taipans. He also recorded eight rebounds and five assists in the game, both season highs. On December 19, he missed his fourth game of the season due to an ankle injury. On January 15, 2016, he scored a season-high 27 points in a 95–68 win over the Sydney Kings, helping the Wildcats snap a three-game losing streak. Between January 25 and February 10, Prather missed three out of four games due to hamstring tightness. He returned for the regular-season finale against the Adelaide 36ers at home on February 14, recording 15 points and six rebounds in a 100–84 win. He went on to lead the Wildcats to a 2–1 semi-final series win over the Illawarra Hawks, scoring 15 points and throwing down a one-handed thunderous slam over Andrew Ogilvy early in the fourth quarter of their Game 3 win. In the NBL Grand Final series, Prather helped the Wildcats defeat the New Zealand Breakers 2–1 to win the championship, as he had a team-high 19 points in the series-clinching 75–52 Game 3 win. He appeared in 27 of the team's 34 games in 2015–16, averaging 16.3 points, 4.5 rebounds, 1.8 assists and 1.2 steals per game. He was subsequently named the club's most valuable player for the 2015–16 season.

2016–17 season

Following the 2015–16 season, Prather pledged to return to Perth for the 2016–17 season. However, in June, he informed the Wildcats he would be scoping his NBA options and chasing his NBA dream. He subsequently joined the Dallas Mavericks for the 2016 Orlando Summer League, where he averaged 11.6 points, 4.2 rebounds, 1.2 assists and 1.6 steals in five games. In July, he changed his mind and committed to another year with the Wildcats, re-signing for the 2016–17 season on July 18.

In the Wildcats' third game of the season on October 14, Prather scored 29 points in a 75–73 win over the New Zealand Breakers. On December 9, he scored a career-high 39 points in a 92–89 win over Melbourne United. On January 16, he missed his first game of the season after pulling up sore following the Wildcats' loss to the Adelaide 36ers two days earlier. On February 10, after struggling for consistency throughout January and early February, Prather scored 29 points in a 101–74 win over the Sydney Kings. Two days later, he recorded 26 points and a career-high 11 assists in a 96–94 win over United. He helped the Wildcats finish the regular season in third place with a 15–13 record. In the Wildcats' semi-final series against the Cairns Taipans, Prather scored 22 points in Game 1 and a game-high 24 points in Game 2 to lead the Wildcats to a 2–0 sweep. In the NBL Grand Final series, Prather scored a game-high 22 points in Game 1; 18 points in Game 2; and 17 points in Game 3, thus leading the Wildcats to their second straight championship with a 3–0 series sweep of the Illawarra Hawks.

Prather was named in the All-NBL First Team and finished second in NBL MVP voting (107 votes) behind Jerome Randle (147) of the Adelaide 36ers. He was also named the club's most valuable player for the 2016–17 season to become the first ever Wildcat to be the club's best in both seasons of a back-to-back championship era, and became the only player to be club MVP in more than one championship season. He also became the eighth Wildcat to win multiple MVPs, the first player in history to take out the award in his first two years in the NBL, and just the second in his first two seasons with the club (the other being James Crawford in 1987 and 1988). Prather appeared in 31 of the team's 33 games in 2016–17, averaging 19.5 points, 4.6 rebounds, 3.5 assists and 1.6 steals per game.

ratiopharm Ulm (2017)
In April 2017, Prather joined German team ratiopharm Ulm for the rest of the 2016–17 Basketball Bundesliga season. He helped the team reach the BBL semi-finals. In 13 games, he averaged 8.5 points, 2.5 rebounds and 1.2 assists per game.

Cleveland Cavaliers (2017)
Prather returned to the NBA Summer League in 2017, this time playing for the Cleveland Cavaliers. In four games, he averaged 9.0 points and 3.5 rebounds per game. Believing he was on the verge of joining the Cavaliers for the season, Prather rejected an offer to return to the Perth Wildcats.

Melbourne United (2017–2018)
After failing to secure an NBA contract, Prather briefly turned his attention to Europe, before instead deciding to return to Australia. With Perth's roster full, Melbourne United approached Prather and provided a great situation and a great opportunity to try to win another championship. He subsequently signed with Melbourne for the 2017–18 NBL season on August 16. He debuted for Melbourne in their season opener on October 5, 2017, scoring 20 points in a 99–97 win over the Adelaide 36ers. In the team's second game of the season on October 14 against the 36ers, Prather went down with a knee injury at the 2:35 mark of the second quarter and did not return. He was subsequently cleared of any serious damage two days later. In his return to Perth on October 20, Prather led United with 16 points and nine rebounds in an 89–84 loss to the Wildcats. On October 28, he scored 30 points in an 87–85 loss to the Brisbane Bullets. On December 16, Prather went down with a dislocated elbow in the second quarter of Melbourne's 84–78 win over Illawarra Hawks. He was subsequently ruled out for a minimum of eight weeks. He was deemed fit to return to action on February 16 against the Wildcats. In his first game back, he scored 14 points in 16 minutes off the bench in a 97–85 win over Perth. United were crowned the minor premiers in 2017–18 with a first-place finish and a 20–8 record. In Game 1 of Melbourne's semi-final series against the fourth-seeded New Zealand Breakers, Prather scored 15 points off the bench in an 88–77 win. He helped Melbourne reach the NBL Grand Final with a 12-point effort in an 88–86 overtime win over the Breakers in Game 2. In Game 2 of the grand final series against the Adelaide 36ers, Prather had a game-high 20 points in a 110–95 loss. In Games 3 and 4, he scored 23 apiece. In Game 5, he recorded 19 points, 11 rebounds and five steals to help Melbourne clinch the championship with a 3–2 series victory over Adelaide behind a 100–82 win. With the win, Prather collected his third NBL championship to become the first player in NBL history to win three straight titles in his first three seasons in the league. In 23 games for United in 2017–18, he averaged 16.7 points, 6.0 rebounds, 2.2 assists and 1.4 steals per game.

Promitheas Patras and BC Khimki (2018)
On April 13, 2018, Prather signed with Promitheas Patras of the Greek Basket League. He appeared in the team's final four games of the regular season and then in all eight of their playoff games, which included losing both the semi-finals and the third-place series. In 12 games, he averaged 11.8 points, 2.3 rebounds, 1.2 assists and 1.0 steals per game.

On July 24, 2018, Prather signed with Russian team BC Khimki on a 1+1 contract. However, a clean-out of his knee resulted in his departure from Russia, as he was replaced on the roster by Garlon Green in November and was unable to make his debut for Khimki.

Return to Melbourne United (2019–2020)
On July 17, 2019, Prather signed a two-year deal with Melbourne United, returning to the team for a second stint. However, due to another knee clean-out, he missed the first seven games of the 2019–20 season. He played in six of the next eight games before missing the rest of the season with a right hamstring tear. Melbourne finished the regular season in fourth place with a 15–13 record, before going on to lose to the Sydney Kings in three games in the semi-finals.

On August 20, 2020, Prather parted ways with United after mutually agreeing to terminate the second season of his contract.

Hapoel Eilat (2020–present)
On August 23, 2020, Prather signed with Hapoel Eilat of the Israeli Basketball Premier League. He averaged 22.5 points (second in the league), 6.0 rebounds and 1.5 steals during the regular season. He had a 41-point game during the regular season and finished with a new club record of 631 points in total. He was subsequently named Israeli League MVP for the 2020–21 season. He was also named to the All-Israeli League Team. He helped Hapoel Eilat reach the semifinals, but sustained a knee injury during the dying seconds of the elimination match. He averaged 22.8 points and 5.8 rebounds in the playoffs.

On October 6, 2021, Prather re-signed with Hapoel Eilat until 2023. After missing the entire 2021–22 season with the knee injury, Prather returned to the team for the 2022–23 season but broke his kneecap during pre-season that ruled him out for two to three months.

References

External links

BC Khimki profile
Perth Wildcats profile
Florida Gators bio
"Sky's the limit for Prather" at nbl.com.au
"US duo's bond runs deep" at thewest.com.au
"United can retain star imports despite new signings" at smh.com.au

1991 births
Living people
American expatriate basketball people in Australia
American expatriate basketball people in Germany
American expatriate basketball people in Greece
American expatriate basketball people in Israel
American men's basketball players
Bakersfield Jam players
Basketball players from Tennessee
Florida Gators men's basketball players
Hapoel Eilat basketball players
Melbourne United players
People from Jackson, Tennessee
Perth Wildcats players
Promitheas Patras B.C. players
Ratiopharm Ulm players
Shooting guards
Small forwards